The 2012–13 FIS Ski Jumping World Cup was the 34th World Cup season in ski jumping for men, the 16th official World Cup season in ski flying and the 2nd World Cup season for ladies. It began on 23 November 2012 in Lillehammer, Norway and ended on 24 March 2013 in Planica, Slovenia.

The defending champions from the previous season were Anders Bardal of Norway and Sarah Hendrickson of the United States. The defending ski flying champion was Robert Kranjec of Slovenia.

Gregor Schlierenzauer of Austria won the overall World Cup title, as well as the ski flying title and the Four Hills Tournament. Norway won the men's Nations Cup and the FIS Team Tour.

Sara Takanashi of Japan won the ladies' overall World Cup title, while the United States won the ladies' Nations Cup.

Season titles

Map of world cup hosts 
All 26 locations hosting world cup events for men (21) and ladies (10) in this season. Oberstdorf hosted FIS Team Tour and four hills tournament.

 Four Hills Tournament
 FIS Team Tour (Oberstdorf ski flying events included)

Calendar

Men

Ladies

Men's team

Mixed

Men's standings

Overall

Ladies' standings

Overall

Achievements
First World Cup career victory
, 17, in her 2nd season – the WC 3 in Sochi; first podium was 2011-12 WC 1 in Lillehammer.
, 28, in her 2nd season – the WC 6 in Schonach; first podium was 2011-12 WC 4 in Val di Fiemme.
, 32, in his 9th season – the WC 14 in Sapporo; it is also the first podium of his career.
, 22, in her 2nd season – the WC 10 in Sapporo
, 19, in his 2nd season – the WC 21 in Klingenthal; it is also the first podium of his career.
, 26, in his 6th season - the WC 26 in Oslo; it is also the first podium of his career.
, 24, in his 6th season – the WC 28 in Planica; first podium was 2012-13 WC 19 in Harrachov

First World Cup podium
, 21, in his 3rd season – no. 2 in the WC 2 in Lillehammer
, 17, in his 1st season – no. 3 in the WC 5 in Sochi
, 18, in her 2nd season – no. 2 in the WC 5 in Schonach
, 19, in his 2nd season – no. 3 in the WC 11 in Bischofshofen
, 23, in his 4th season – no. 3 in the WC 12 in Wisła
, 21, in her 2nd season – no. 3 in the WC 11 in Zao
, 22, in his 6th season – no. 3 in the WC 19 in Harrachov
, 24, in his 3rd season – no. 2 in the WC 22 in Oberstdorf
, 20, in his 4th season – no. 3 in the WC 27 in Planica

Victory in this World Cup (in brackets victory for all time)
 , 10 (50) first places
 , 8 (9) first places
 , 3 (9) first places
 , 2 (12) first places
 , 2 (11) first places
 , 2 (7) first places
 , 2 (4) first places
 , 2 (3) first places
 , 2 (2) first places
 , 2 (2) first places
 , 1 (5) first places
 , 1 (5) first places
 , 1 (3) first places
 , 1 (1) first places
 , 1 (1) first places
 , 1 (1) first places
 , 1 (1) first places
 , 1 (1) first places

References

World cup
World cup
FIS Ski Jumping World Cup
Qualification events for the 2014 Winter Olympics
Ski Jumping